Grigory Silovich Ostrovsky (1756–1814) was a Russian portrait painter active during the 18th century in the Kostroma Governorate.

Career 
Almost nothing is known of Ostrovsky's life, and little is known about his career; the only paintings which can be definitively traced to him are 17 signed and dated portraits which were discovered in the 1970s by Savva Yamshchikov.  All of the paintings were made in the 1770s and 1780s and come from the Neronovo estate, located about 25 km SE of Soligalich.  In the eighteenth century this belonged to the Cherevin family, and most of the portraits are of members of the family.  Stylistically, the paintings appear to be the work of an itinerant painter; there is a possibility, too, that he may have studied icon painting. Presumably, Ostrovsky originally was from Veliky Ustyug.

Ostrovsky's paintings are currently held by the Soligalich Regional Studies Museum in Soligalich.

References 

Olga's Gallery
 

18th-century painters from the Russian Empire
Russian male painters
19th-century painters from the Russian Empire
1756 births
1814 deaths
People from Veliky Ustyug
Russian people of Ukrainian descent
19th-century male artists from the Russian Empire